Farah is a town and a nagar panchayat in Mathura district  in the state of Uttar Pradesh, India.

Education

 Sachdeva Institute of Technology
 Hindustan College of Science and Technology

Demographics
As of the 2001 Census of India, Farah had a population of 8,199. Males constitute 54% of the population and females 46%. Farah has an average literacy rate of 52%, lower than the national average of 59.5%: male literacy is 61%, and female literacy is 41%. In Farah, 20% of the population is under 6 years of age.

Climate
Farah features a semiarid climate that borders on a humid subtropical climate. The town features mild winters, hot and dry summers and a monsoon season. However the monsoons, though substantial in Farah, are not quite as heavy as the monsoon in other parts of India. This is a primary factor in Farah featuring a semiarid climate as opposed to a humid subtropical climate.

Geography
It has an average elevation of 172 metres (564 feet).

References

Cities and towns in Mathura district